Cicis is an American chain of buffet restaurants based in Coppell, Texas, specializing in pizza. The company was founded in 1985, and started franchising by 1987. There are 299 franchised and corporately owned restaurants in 24 states. In November 2015, the company began a new marketing campaign which included the renaming of the company to Cicis (by dropping the apostrophe, making the second 'C' lowercase and dropping the word ‘pizza’ from its name), along with the addition of a new logo and redesigned website.

History

Cicis was founded in 1985 by Joe Croce and Mike Cole in Plano, Texas. In 2001, with 363 restaurants at the time, the chain expanded its buffet offerings and began remodeling restaurants. Four years later, Cicis had more than 500 locations, and was the fastest-growing pizza chain in the United States.

In 2003, Croce retired from the business, and passed ownership of the company to the company's executive team. Craig Moore, who was a general manager in Dallas, became vice president of the company, a position he held for five years before he was named president after the sale. Croce gave 20% of his proceeds to Gateway Church, where he was a member. As president of the chain, Moore oversaw the company's operations and franchise growth. Moore announced his retirement in 2009, after 17 years with the company.

Michael Shumsky, previously CEO of La Madeleine Restaurant, Inc. took over for Moore. Shumsky retired in August 2013 and Darin Harris took over as CEO of the company. Harris left the company in January 2018 and was replaced by Bill Mitchell as interim CEO. Mitchell was appointed to the position permanently in March 2018.

In addition to its current restaurants, in 2010 Cicis announced plans to add another 500 restaurants in the next 10 years (with the possibility of expanding internationally into Canada and Mexico). Cicis has won numerous awards and has also been named one of the top 25 performing brands by The Wall Street Journal and a top 200 franchise concept by Franchise Today. The award for worst restaurant ideas has also been awarded to the pizza chain.

In November 2015, the company began a new marketing campaign which included the simplified renaming of the company to just Cicis with the modifier "Beyond Pizza," along with the addition of a new logo and redesigned website. The campaign is aimed at proving that Cicis has more to offer than just pizza.

On January 25, 2021, Cici's filed for Chapter 11 bankruptcy with between $50 million to $100 million in liabilities. The company blamed the COVID-19 pandemic in its filing, stating that it had not benefitted from delivery due to its buffet model. The previous month, the company reached an agreement to sell itself as well as its $82 million in liabilities to its primary lender, D&G Investors. On March 16, 2021, Cicis emerged from bankruptcy and completed its sale to D&G Investors, an affiliate of SSCP Management and Gala Capital Partners.

Recognition and awards
From 2004 to 2009, CiCi's Pizza held third place in the pizza category for Restaurants & Institutions "Consumers' Choice in Chains" contest, which is judged based on consumer reviews of the competing restaurant chains. In March 2009 Men's Health gave CiCi's Pizza "top marks" in providing healthy food choices among its list of "66 major chain restaurants".

See also
 List of buffet restaurants

References

External links

Restaurants established in 1985
Buffet restaurants
Pizza chains of the United States
Restaurants in Texas
Italian-American culture in Texas
Restaurant chains in the United States
Companies based in Irving, Texas
1985 establishments in Texas
Privately held companies based in Texas
Companies that filed for Chapter 11 bankruptcy in 2021